Reishia bitubercularis, common names bituberculate rock shell, bituberculate rock snail, chestnut rock shell, is a species of sea snail, a marine gastropod mollusk, in the family Muricidae, the murex snails or rock snails.

Description
The length of the shell attains 45 mm.

Distribution
This marine species occurs off the Philippines.

References

 Deshayes, G. P., 1841-44 Magasin de Zoologie, d'Anatomie Comparée et Paléontologie, Pls. 86.
 Claremont M., Vermeij G.J., Williams S.T. & Reid D.G. (2013) Global phylogeny and new classification of the Rapaninae (Gastropoda: Muricidae), dominant molluscan predators on tropical rocky seashores. Molecular Phylogenetics and Evolution 66: 91–102.

External links
 Lamarck, (J.-B. M.) de. (1822). Histoire naturelle des animaux sans vertèbres. Tome septième. Paris: published by the Author, 711 pp
 Adams, A. & Reeve, L. A. (1848-1850). Mollusca. In A. Adams (ed.), The zoology of the voyage of H.M.S. Samarang, under the command of Captain Sir Edward Belcher, C.B., F.R.A.S., F.G.S., during the years 1843-1846. Reeve & Benham, London, x + 87 pp., 24 pls.
 Blainville, H. M. D. de. (1832). Disposition méthodique des espèces récentes et fossiles des genres Pourpre, Ricinule, Licorne et Concholépas de M. de Lamarck, et description des espèces nouvelles ou peu connues, faisant partie de la collection du Muséum d'Histoire Naturelle de Paris. Nouvelles Annales du Muséum d'Histoire Naturelle. 1: 189-263, pls 9-12

bitubercularis
Gastropods described in 1822